Stary Dvor is a rural locality (a village) in Tarnogskoye Rural Settlement, Tarnogsky District, Vologda Oblast, Russia. The population was 80 as of 2002.

Geography 
Stary Dvor is located 17 km southwest of Tarnogsky Gorodok (the district's administrative centre) by road. Yugra is the nearest rural locality.

References 

Rural localities in Tarnogsky District